Oedaspis is a genus of tephritid  or fruit flies in the family Tephritidae.

Species
Oedaspis amani Freidberg & Kaplan, 1992
Oedaspis apicalis Hardy & Drew, 1996
Oedaspis australis (Malloch, 1939)
Oedaspis austrina Hardy & Drew, 1996
Oedaspis chinensis Bezzi, 1920
Oedaspis congoensis Freidberg & Kaplan, 1992
Oedaspis continua Hardy & Drew, 1996
Oedaspis crocea Munro, 1939
Oedaspis daphnea Séguy, 1930
Oedaspis dichotoma Loew, 1869
Oedaspis dorsocentralis Zia, 1938
Oedaspis escheri Bezzi, 1910
Oedaspis farinosa Hendel, 1927
Oedaspis fini Freidberg, 1994
Oedaspis fissa Loew, 1862
Oedaspis formosana Shiraki, 1933
Oedaspis gallicola Hardy & Drew, 1996
Oedaspis goodenia Hardy & Drew, 1996
Oedaspis hardyi Norrbom, 1999
Oedaspis hyalibasis Freidberg & Kaplan, 1992
Oedaspis inflata (Munro, 1954)
Oedaspis japonica Shiraki, 1933
Oedaspis kaszabi Richter, 1973
Oedaspis maraisi Munro, 1935
Oedaspis meissneri Hering, 1938
Oedaspis mouldsi Hardy & Drew, 1996
Oedaspis multifasciata (Loew, 1850)
Oedaspis nyx Freidberg & Kaplan, 1992
Oedaspis olearia Hardy & Drew, 1996
Oedaspis ouinensis Hancock, 2008
Oedaspis pauliani (Munro, 1952)
Oedaspis perkinsi Hardy & Drew, 1996
Oedaspis plucheivora Freidberg & Kaplan, 1992
Oedaspis quinotata (Munro, 1939)
Oedaspis quinquiefasciata Becker, 1908
Oedaspis ragdai Hering, 1940
Oedaspis reducta Freidberg & Kaplan, 1992
Oedaspis reticulata Freidberg & Kaplan, 1992
Oedaspis russa Munro, 1935
Oedaspis schatchi Korneyev, 2002
Oedaspis semihyalina Hardy & Drew, 1996
Oedaspis serrata Freidberg & Kaplan, 1992
Oedaspis trapezoidalis Munro, 1938
Oedaspis trifasciata (Malloch, 1939)
Oedaspis trimaculata Hardy & Drew, 1996
Oedaspis trotteriana Bezzi, 1913
Oedaspis villeneuvei Bezzi, 1913
Oedaspis whitei Hardy & Drew, 1996

Oedaspis apiciclara Hardy & Drew, 1996 was moved to Liepana.
Oedaspis latifasciata Hering, 1937 is a synonym of Oedaspis fissa Loew, 1862.

References

External links

Tephritinae
Tephritidae genera
Diptera of Asia
Diptera of Africa
Diptera of Australasia